Duchess Elisabeth Albertine of Saxe-Hildburghausen (4 August 1713 – 29 June 1761) was a Duchess of Mecklenburg-Strelitz. She served as regent for her son after the deaths in 1752–1753 of her husband and brother-in-law of, respectively, the ducal appanage of Mirow and of the Duchy of Mecklenburg-Strelitz.

Biography 
Elisabeth Albertine was a daughter of Ernest Frederick I, Duke of Saxe-Hildburghausen (1681–1724), and his wife, Countess Sophia Albertine of Erbach-Erbach (1683–1742).

On 5 February 1735, Elisabeth married Duke Charles Louis Frederick of Mecklenburg-Mirow (23 February 1707 – 5 June 1752) at Eisfeld, the youngest son of Adolphus Frederick II, Duke of Mecklenburg-Strelitz, and half-brother to Adolphus Frederick III. They became the parents of ten children.

The death of her childless brother-in-law on 11 December 1752, six months after she was widowed, left Albertine as regent of both men's duchies on behalf of her eldest son, Adolphus Frederick IV, until he attained his majority at the age of 14 on 17 January 1753. During that brief period she ruled the Strelitz duchies under the protection of George II of Great Britain, warding off encroachments from Duke Christian Ludwig II, ruler of the Schwerin branch of the House of Mecklenburg.

She died in 1761, shortly before the marriage of her daughter Sophia Charlotte to King George III of Great Britain, and was buried at the ducal crypt in Mirow.

Issue
Elisabeth had ten children, including the future Queen Charlotte, consort to King George III of the United Kingdom.

Ancestry

References

1713 births
1761 deaths
House of Saxe-Hildburghausen
House of Mecklenburg-Strelitz
People from Hildburghausen
Duchesses of Mecklenburg-Strelitz
Princesses of Saxe-Hildburghausen
18th-century women rulers
Daughters of monarchs